is a Pokémon species in Nintendo and Game Freak's Pokémon franchise. Created by Takeshi Shudo and drawn by Ken Sugimori, Lugia was the central character of the film Pokémon: The Movie 2000. It later served as the version mascot of the video game Pokémon Silver and its remake, Pokémon SoulSilver, appearing both on the box art and in-game. It also appeared in the Pokémon anime, various merchandise, spin-off titles and printed adaptations of the franchise, such as Pokémon Adventures. In animated appearances, Lugia is voiced in Japanese by Koichi Yamadera, and by Eric Rath in the English dub.

In the Pokémon universe, Lugia is strongly associated with the sea, and the element of water, in contrast to Ho-Oh, the version mascot of Pokémon Gold and Pokémon HeartGold, which is associated with fire. As a Psychic-type and Flying-type Pokémon, Lugia possesses multiple psychic abilities, such as telepathy, and can fly, in addition to its water-based powers. While depicted as a male in the original film, it was originally envisioned as a "maternal" Pokémon that shared male and female traits. Lugia has received positive reception from critics, citing the creature's design.

Design and characteristics
Considered a legendary Pokémon within the setting of the games, Lugia is characterized as the "Diving Pokémon" in the Pokédex and the latter states that Lugia is known as "The Guardian of the Sea". It has been more often compared to a dragon, bird, wyvern or sea monster, 1UP.com calling it a "sleek, draconic creature". The Hartford Courant described Lugia as resembling a "flying white lizard", adding that its wings more closely resembled "huge cartoon paws". It is primarily pale silver-white, but has blue undersides with slightly varying tones. It has a somewhat beak-like, ridged mouth, although it has teeth on its lower jaw. Its head has a point to the back, and its eyes have pointed blue spikes on them. Lugia has a long slender neck and its body is smooth and covered with streamlined feathers, with the exception of dark blue or black spike-like protrusions which run down the length of its back, and two smaller ones on the ends of its tail. It has large wings that resemble hands, similar to a personified bird wing. Lugia possess the ability to calm storms and are said to appear when storms start. It is also said to be able to spawn a storm lasting as long as 40 days by flapping its wings. A light flutter of a Lugia's wings is capable of causing winds powerful enough to blow apart regular houses. Lugia is highly intelligent, and isolates itself at the bottom of the sea, where it tends to slumber in solitude at the bottom of a deep oceanic trench, in order to avoid accidentally causing damage with the devastating power it packs.

Appearances
In Lugia's initial appearance for Pokémon: The Movie 2000, Lawrence III, an arrogant and rich man who calls himself "The Collector", captures the three legendary birds Articuno, Zapdos, and Moltres, with the intent of summoning Lugia, the "beast of the sea", voiced by Eric Rath. Ash Ketchum joins forces with a begrudging Team Rocket to prevent the world's destruction by gathering three orbs in the Orange Islands and placating Lugia.

In the video games
In Pokémon Gold and Silver and Pokémon HeartGold and SoulSilver, Lugia is a powerful legendary Pokémon that lives in a far-off location, and can be caught by the player. It is found in the depths of a sea cave located at the Whirl Islands, a group of isolated islands surrounded by whirlpools located off Route 41. In order to access Lugia, the player must obtain both HM 06 Whirlpool and the Silver Wing item. It later appeared in other Pokémon games such as Pokémon Gold and Silver, Pokémon Crystal, Pokémon Stadium 2, Pokémon Ruby and Sapphire, Pokémon FireRed and LeafGreen, Pokémon Emerald, Pokémon Diamond and Pearl,  Pokémon Platinum, Pokémon HeartGold and SoulSilver, Pokémon Black and White, Pokémon Black 2 and White 2. Pokémon X and Y, Pokémon Omega Ruby and Alpha Sapphire, Pokémon Ultra Sun and Ultra Moon and Pokémon Sword and Shield.

Outside of the main series, Lugia also appeared in Pokémon Trozei!, Pokémon Mystery Dungeon: Blue Rescue Team and Red Rescue Team, Pokémon Mystery Dungeon: Explorers of Sky, Pokémon Ranger: Guardian Signs, Pokémon Rumble Blast, Pokémon Rumble U, Pokémon Battle Trozei, Pokémon Shuffle, Pokémon Rumble World, Pokémon Picross, Pokémon Rumble Rush, Pokémon Super Mystery Dungeon, Pokémon Mystery Dungeon: Rescue Team DX, Pokémon XD: Gale of Darkness, Pokkén Tournament, Pokémon Go and New Pokémon Snap, A Lugia is also featured in the Super Smash Bros. series from Super Smash Bros. Melee onwards, when released from a Poké Ball, will fly up and unleash its signature Aeroblast attack. It may also periodically emit its signature cry.

In other media
In the anime, a young Lugia named Silver makes an appearance when the protagonist, Ash, travels to the Whirl Islands where he meets a friend of his, named Ritchie, to help stop a Team Rocket scientist from separating Silver from its parent, another Lugia. It also appeared in Pokémon: The Movie 2000, Pokémon the Movie: Hoopa and the Clash of Ages, Pokémon Adventures, Pokémon the Movie: The Power of Us and Pokémon Generations.

Development 
Lugia was originally conceived by Takeshi Shudo, the head writer of the first Pokémon anime. He was given a large amount of creative freedom for Pokémon The First Movie due to the ongoing Dennō Senshi Porygon photosensitive epilepsy incident, also known as the "Pokémon Shock", leading to the first film being much darker than would otherwise have been allowed. The first movie's runaway blockbuster success made his creative freedom for the sequel, Pokémon The Movie 2000, "near-total". This also included the ability to create the film's main Pokémon, which was named Lugia by majority vote. Unlike most Pokémon, the name of Lugia has no apparent basis in any real word, although it may have stemmed from the Latin word "Lugeo", or "to lie dormant". Stating that Lugia had been designed solely for the movie, Shudo expressed surprise that the creature was later featured in the video games and TV show.

Lugia, who possessed a speaking role in the film, was given a masculine voice. However, Shudo intended Lugia as a creature that was simultaneously male and female. This dual nature was intended to embody one of the film's main messages, that people can be different and yet coexist without resorting to conflict. He showed "overwhelming regret that he allowed Lugia to be voiced by a man", considering Lugia, the "creator of all life on Earth", to be a "maternal Pokémon". Stating that "it was too late, we couldn’t suddenly change Lugia into a female", the change was so significant to him that it made him start "gulping down alcohol and drugs" and "feel like [he] wanted to die". During the final few years of his life, Shudo became "obsessed" with Lugia, writing numerous blog posts on the subject.

The Shadow Lugia variant first used in Pokémon XD was notably one of the first Pokémon to be designed by a Westerner, James Turner, who was later made the art director of Pokémon Sword and Shield due to the fact that it was based on his homeland.

Promotion and reception
The Telegram & Gazette stated that attempts to merchandise the character were poorly received, namely due to lack of familiarity on the part of consumers with the character. September 2000 saw Lugia-themed Chrysler PT Cruisers touring the United States and visiting IGN offices to promote the games Pokémon Gold and Silver, Hey You, Pikachu!, and Pokémon Puzzle League. IGN readers voted Lugia as the fifth-best pocket monster. Dale Bishir of IGN described Lugia as the 11th most important Pokémon that impacted the franchise's history, and further stated that as the mascot for Pokémon Silver, Lugia was heavily featured in the second Pokémon movie, Pokemon 2000. Bobby Anhalt of Screen Rant described Lugia as the best legendary Pokémon, and further stated that Lugia was the resident badass in the franchise's second film. Raymond Padilla of GamesRadar stated that Lugia in Pokémon: The Movie 2000 is "Pokemusings". International Business Times cited Lugia as an example of best Pokémon design in Generation II.

Lugia has had positive reception. 1UP.com's Jeremy Parish praised the design, calling it a "sleek, draconic creature" similar to the Final Fantasy VIII rendition of the Aztec god Quetzalcoatl, and attributing the preference consumers had for Pokémon Silver over Pokémon Gold reflected in sales to its role as the game's mascot. Authors Tracey West and Katherine Noll called Lugia the sixth best Legendary Pokémon and the fourth best Pokémon overall. IGN also ranked Lugia as the 4th best Pokémon, where the staff called it one of the series' most iconic designs. In contrast, the Daily Texan criticized Lugia as lacking a more "human personality" like other Pokémon. They felt that while it had an animalistic grace, the effect was ruined in the animated film by its voice.

References

External links

 Lugia on Pokemon.com
 Lugia on Bulbapedia

Dragon characters in video games
Fictional birds
Fictional psychics
Fictional undersea characters
Film characters introduced in 1999
Pokémon species
Telepath characters in video games
Video game characters introduced in 1999
Video game characters with air or wind abilities
Video game mascots